Mississippi's 7th congressional district existed from 1883 to 1953. It was created after the 1880 census and abolished following the 1950 census.

A total of 10 representatives (all Democrats) served the district during its existence.

Boundaries
The 7th congressional district boundaries included all of Amite, Claiborne, Copiah, Franklin, Jefferson, Lincoln, Pike, and Wilkinson County. It also included the western portion of modern Walthall County (included as part of Pike County at that time).

List of members representing the district

References

 Congressional Biographical Directory of the United States 1774–present

07
Former congressional districts of the United States
1883 establishments in Mississippi
1953 disestablishments in Mississippi